Grothendieck's relative point of view is a heuristic applied in certain abstract mathematical situations, with a rough meaning of taking for consideration families of 'objects' explicitly depending on parameters, as the basic field of study, rather than a single such object. It is named after Alexander Grothendieck, who made extensive use of it in treating foundational aspects of algebraic geometry. Outside that field, it has been influential particularly on category theory and categorical logic.

In the usual formulation, the point of view treats, not objects X of a given category C, but morphisms

f: X → S

where S is a fixed object. This idea is made formal in the idea of the slice category of objects of C 'above' S. To move from one slice to another requires a base change; from a technical point of view base change becomes a major issue for the whole approach (see for example Beck–Chevalley conditions).

A base change 'along' a given morphism

g: T → S

is typically given by the fiber product, producing an object over T from one over S. The 'fiber' terminology is significant: the underlying heuristic is that X over S is a family of fibers, one for each 'point' of S; the fiber product is then the family on T, which described by fibers is for each point of T the fiber at its image in S. This set-theoretic language is too naïve to fit the required context, certainly, from algebraic geometry. It combines, though, with the use of the Yoneda lemma to replace the 'point' idea with that of treating an object, such as S, as 'as good as' the representable functor it sets up.

The Grothendieck–Riemann–Roch theorem from about 1956 is usually cited as the key moment for the introduction of this circle of ideas. The more classical types of Riemann–Roch theorem are recovered in the case where S is a single point (i.e. the final object in the working category C).  Using other S is a way to have versions of theorems 'with parameters', i.e. allowing for continuous variation, for which the 'frozen' version reduces the parameters to constants.

In other applications, this way of thinking has been used in topos theory, to clarify the role of set theory in foundational matters. Assuming that we don't have a commitment to one 'set theory' (all toposes are in some sense equally set theories for some intuitionistic logic) it is possible to state everything relative to some given set theory that acts as a base topos.

See also
This article uses terminology from category theory.
Fiber product of schemes

References

Scheme theory
Category theory